The Inca Empire was the largest empire in pre-Columbian America.

Inca, Inka, or İncə may also refer to:

 Inca civilization, centered in what is now Peru
 Inca people, the people of the Inca Empire
 Quechua people, the people of the Inca civilization
 Inca language, the Quechuan languages
 Sapa Inca or Inka, the main ruler of the Inca Empire

People
 Glacinei Martins or Inca (born 1973), Brazilian footballer
 Edwin Valero or El Inca (1981-2010), Venezuela boxer
 Garcilaso de la Vega (chronicler) or El Inca (1539–1616), Spanish Peruvian writer
 INCA (singer) (born 1985), French singer
 Inka, nom de guerre of Danuta Siedzikówna (1928–1946), Polish national heroine, medical orderly in the Home Army
 Inka Bause (born 1968), German singer, TV presenter and actress
 Inka Essenhigh (born 1969), American painter
 Inka Friedrich (born 1965), German actress
 Inka Grings (born 1978), German footballer
 Inka Parei (born 1967), German writer
 Inka Wesely (born 1991), German footballer

Places
 Inka (La Paz), a mountain in the La Paz Department, Bolivia
 İncə, Goychay, Azerbaijan
 İncə, Shaki, Azerbaijan
 Inca, Spain, a town on the island of Majorca in the Mediterranean Sea

Transportation
 Los Incas - Parque Chas (Buenos Aires Underground), metro subway station
 SEAT Inca, a panel van
 Industri Kereta Api (INKA), a rolling stock manufacturer in Indonesia

Ships
 Inca (schooner), the first five-masted schooner built on the United States western coast, in 1896
 , U.S. Navy ship name
 USS Inca (1898), a screw steamer
 USS Inca (1911), a steam ferry
 USS Inca (SP-1212), a motor boat built in 1917
 USS Inca (ID-3219), an iron tugboat built in 1879
 USS Inca (IX-229), an unclassified miscellaneous vessel

Biology
 Inca (beetle), a genus of beetles in the subfamily Cetoniinae
 Inca (hummingbird), the common name for several hummingbirds in the genus Coeligena

Computing
 Inca (video game), a 1992 adventure game by Coktel Vision
 INCA (software),  measurement, calibration and diagnostic software published by ETAS
 INCA Internet, South Korean company

Food
 Inka (drink), a Polish roasted grain drink
 Inca Kola, a carbonated soft drink from Peru

Other uses
 Inka (dharma), dharma transmission in Zen Buddhism
 El Inca (film), 2016 Venezuelan drama film directed by Ignacio Castillo Cottin
 Los Incas, Andean folk music group
 Inka shōmei, a form of dharma transmission in Zen Buddhism
 Ion and Neutral Camera (INCA), an instrument aboard the Cassini–Huygens spacecraft

See also

 Incan (disambiguation)
 
 
 
 
 CNIB Foundation
 INKAS, Canadian armoured transport, strongbox, security services company
 Quechua (disambiguation)